Mourad Badra (born September 14, 1987, in Rouen) is a French professional football player. Currently, he plays in the Championnat National for AS Beauvais.

He played on the professional level in Ligue 2 for En Avant de Guingamp.

1987 births
Living people
French footballers
Ligue 2 players
En Avant Guingamp players
FC Rouen players
Footballers from Rouen
Association football midfielders